Count Nikolay Semyonovich Mordvinov (17 April 1754 – 30 March 1845) was one of the most reputable Russian political thinkers of Alexander I's reign. He is associated with the reforms of Mikhail Speransky, who he advised on the ways to improve the performance of the national economy.

Mordvinov was an admiral's son and started his career in the Navy at an early age. He started his service in 1766 in the rank of midshipman.  An Anglophile like his peer Chichagov, he spent three years – from 1774 to 1777 – serving on English ships in British North America. In 1783, he accompanied Chichagov during his expedition into the Mediterranean. However, he felt ill at ease with Potemkin's and De Ribas's management of the Imperial Russian Navy and retired in the late 1780s.

His career took a leap forward under Emperor Paul, who shared his intense dislike of Potemkin's coterie and recalled Mordvinov to service with the rank of admiral. In 1799, he was appointed Vice-President of the Admiralty. Three years later, when the Admiralty was transformed into the Navy Ministry, he became the first Navy Minister of Imperial Russia, but ceded this post to Pavel Chichagov within three months.

Mordvinov's independent-mindedness and Anglophile way of life made him a darling of the Muscovite society. In 1806, the Muscovite nobility elected him to lead a volunteer corps rallied against Napoleon. He became particularly popular with young liberals, who admired his courage to oppose the government when needed. Both Kondraty Ryleev and Alexander Pushkin dedicated enthusiastic poems to him.

He considered serfdom to be the main obstacle to the successful economic development of
Russia, and wrote that "Freedom, property, enlightenment and justice are the
main and only origins of wealth". He also advocated free enterprise, principles
of private property and, like Vorontsov, defended a protectionist customs tariff.

In 1823, Mordvinov was elected President of the Free Economic Society, a high-profile position which he filled for 17 years. During his term in office, he outlined his economic views in a number of writings. Mordvinov died at the age of 90 in St Petersburg.

Honours and awards
 Order of St. Andrew
 Order of St. Alexander Nevsky
 Order of St. Vladimir, 1st class
 Order of St. Anne, 1st class

References

Ikonnikov V.S. Граф Н.С. Мордвинов. Saint Petersburg, 1873.

Imperial Russian Navy admirals
Counts of the Russian Empire
Russian economists
Politicians of the Russian Empire
Members of the State Council (Russian Empire)
Members of the Russian Academy
Honorary members of the Saint Petersburg Academy of Sciences
Mordvin people
1754 births
1845 deaths
Recipients of the Order of St. Vladimir, 1st class
Recipients of the Order of St. Anna, 1st class
Burials at Lazarevskoe Cemetery (Saint Petersburg)